Dame Gaylene Mary Preston  (born 1 June 1947) is a New Zealand filmmaker with a particular interest in documentary films.

Early life and family
Born in Greymouth on 1 June 1947, Preston was educated at Colenso High School (now William Colenso College) in Napier. She went on to study at the Ilam School of Fine Arts at the University of Canterbury from 1966 to 1968, and then the St Albans School of Fine Art in Hertfordshire, England, where she completed a Diploma of Art Therapy in 1974.

Preston's sister is the pianist and songwriter Jan Preston. She has one daughter, the actor Chelsie Preston Crayford, who was born in 1987.

Career
Preston's first film was All The Way Up There (1979). As a producer she has contributed to the award-winning feature documentaries Punitive Damage (1999) and Coffee, Tea or Me? (2001) and Lands of our Fathers (executive producer). Her feature film Home By Christmas was a dramatised oral history based on her father's memories of his wartime experiences, contrasted with her mother's perspective. The music for the film was composed by her sister Jan Preston.

Her other feature films include Mr Wrong, Ruby and Rata, and the mini series Bread & Roses (with producer Robin Laing).  She was writer, director and producer of Perfect Strangers, a black comedy starring Sam Neill and Rachael Blake. In 1982 Gaylene directed a documentary called Making Utu about the making of Geoff Murphy's iconic feature Utu.

Preston chaired the Academy of Film and Television Arts (1997–99) and was a member of the board of the NZ Film Commission (1979–85) as well as chair of the Film Innovation Fund (1981–85).  She has been a member of the Board of New Zealand On Air (The NZ Broadcasting Commission), and in 2001 she was the first filmmaker to be made a Laureate by the New Zealand Arts Foundation, recognising her contribution to New Zealand film and television. 

In the 2002 New Year Honours, Preston was appointed an Officer of the New Zealand Order of Merit, for services to film making, and in 2016, she received the New Zealand Women of Influence Award for Arts and Culture in recognition of her work on New Zealand-focused films and documentaries.

In May 2011 she publicly protested plans for Wellington Airport to erect a Wellywood sign on the hill beside the Miramar Cutting, the highest-profile industry opponent of this initiative.

Preston was awarded the Lia Award at the Stranger with my Face film festival in Tasmania in 2017. The award recognises an influential and innovative figure in the field of genre storytelling. At the festival they screened Gaylene's film Mr Wrong and Perfect Strangers, which were reviewed in depth by Lauren Carroll Harris for Real Time.

She wrote, directed and produced Hope and Wire (2014) a drama mini series about the aftermath of the 2010/2011 Christchurch earthquakes.

Preston's most recent documentary feature film My Year with Helen (2017) premiered at the Athena Film Festival in February 2018.

In the 2019 New Year Honours, Preston was appointed a Dame Companion of the New Zealand Order of Merit, for services to film.

References

External links
 
 http://www.perfectstrangersthemovie.com
biography on NZ On Screen
screenography on NZ On Screen
Gaylene Preston Archive & Reference Project, Women's Gallery Inc., 2012
The Dame Gaylene Preston Legacy Collection Finding Aid v1.1

1947 births
People from Greymouth
Living people
New Zealand film directors
New Zealand film producers
Dames Companion of the New Zealand Order of Merit
People associated with the Museum of New Zealand Te Papa Tongarewa
New Zealand Women of Influence Award recipients
Ilam School of Fine Arts alumni
Alumni of the University of Hertfordshire
People educated at William Colenso College
New Zealand women film producers